Charles J. Girard (July 23, 1917 – January 17, 1970) was a brigadier general in the United States Army.  Assigned to head the Capital Military Assistance Command in Saigon in November 1969, he suffered a cerebral hemorrhage two months later, becoming one of the highest-ranking American officers to die in South Vietnam during the Vietnam War.

A native of Sumter, South Carolina and a graduate of The Citadel, Girard taught school and served in the Army Reserve prior to World War II.  During the war he took part in combat throughout Africa and Europe, and attained the rank of lieutenant colonel as commander of the 82nd Armored Reconnaissance Battalion.  He remained in the Army after the war, and continued to serve in combat and training assignments, primarily in the Armor branch.

During the Vietnam War, Girard was Deputy Commander of the Capital Military Assistance Command (CMAC) in Saigon (March–November 1969).  In November, he was appointed as CMAC's commander.  In January 1970, Girard died from a cerebral hemorrhage while still serving in South Vietnam; he was buried at Arlington National Cemetery.

Early life
Charles Jack Girard was born in Sumter, South Carolina on July 23, 1917, and he graduated from Sumter High School. In 1938 he graduated from The Citadel with a Bachelor of Science degree in business administration.  Girard was commissioned through the Reserve Officers' Training Corps as a second lieutenant in the Army Reserve and taught high school from 1938 to 1940.

World War II
In anticipation of U.S. entry into World War II, Girard was among thousands of reservists and National Guard members called to active duty in 1940.  He completed the Infantry Officer Basic and Advanced Courses, and served initially as a platoon leader in the 82nd Armored Reconnaissance Battalion at Fort Benning, Georgia.  His battalion was part of the 2nd Armored Division, and Girard rose to captain and commander of a company as his battalion served in the Mediterranean and European Theaters of Operations.  He took part in the Tunisia, Sicily, Normandy, Northern France, Rhineland, Ardennes, and Central Europe campaigns, and he was battalion commander with the rank of major at the end of the war.

Post-World War II
After the war Girard received his commission as a regular Army officer and transferred to the Cavalry.  He remained in Europe as commander of 2nd Battalion, 67th Armored Regiment, 2nd Armored Division.  In May 1946, he was assigned to the headquarters staff for United States Forces in Austria.

In 1947 Girard was assigned to the staff of the Georgia Military District Headquarters, and from 1949 to 1950 he was a student at the United States Army Command and General Staff College.  He spent five years on the staff of the United States Army Armor School at Fort Knox.  From 1955 to 1957 he commanded 83rd Reconnaissance Battalion, 3rd Armored Division, first at Fort Knox, and later in Europe.

Girard served in the Plans, Operations and Training (G-3) section at Headquarters, United States Army Europe from 1957 to 1959, first as chief of the NATO Training Section, and then chief of the Training Branch.  From 1959 to 1960 he was a student at the United States Army War College, after which he served as deputy commander and then commander of Combat Command A, 1st Armored Division at Fort Hood.

Later career
In 1961 Girard was assigned to the Doctrine and Concepts Division, Combat Developments Directorate in the office of the Army's Deputy Chief of Staff for Plans, Operations and Training (G-3), and he later served as chief of the Doctrine and Concepts Division.  During this posting Girard carried out a temporary assignment as deputy chief of the Long Range Plans Group for the Howze Board.  In 1963 he was appointed assistant director for Materiel Requirements in the office of the Army's Assistant Chief of Staff for Force Development.

In August 1963 Girard was assigned to command Combat Developments Command Experimentation Center at Fort Ord and promoted to brigadier general.  In May, 1965 he was assigned as Assistant Chief of Staff for Data Systems at Headquarters, Seventh United States Army in Europe.

Girard was assigned to Frankfurt, West Germany as the 3rd Armored Division's Assistant Division Commander for Maneuver in July, 1966, and he served until January 1968.  He was Assistant Deputy Chief of Staff for Military Operations &  Reserve Forces at Headquarters, Continental Army Command until March, 1969.

Vietnam War

From March to November 1969 Girard was Deputy Commander of the Capital Military Assistance Command (CMAC) in Saigon, the unit that aided the South Vietnamese military in defending the city and its suburbs.  In November, 1969 he was appointed commander, and he served until his death.

Death and burial
On January 17, 1970 Girard was found dead in his quarters at the CMAC headquarters in Gia Định Province outside Saigon.  His death was attributed to a cerebral hemorrhage, and he was one of the highest ranking American officers to die in South Vietnam during the Vietnam War. He was buried at Arlington National Cemetery, Section 1, Site 32-2.

Awards and decorations
 Army Distinguished Service Medal 
 Silver Star 
 Legion of Merit with 2 Bronze Oak leaf clusters 
 Distinguished Flying Cross 
 Bronze Star Medal 
 Army Commendation Medal with 1 Bronze Oak leaf cluster
 American Defense Service Medal 
 American Campaign Medal 
 European-African-Middle Eastern Campaign Medal with 1 Silver service star, 2 Bronze service stars and 1 Arrowhead device 
 Medal for Humane Action with Germany Clasp 
 World War II Victory Medal with 2 Bronze oak leaf clusters 
 Army of Occupation Medal 
 National Defense Service Medal 
 Vietnam Service Medal 
 Belgian Fourragère 
 Vietnam Campaign Medal

Family
Girard was married to Joan E. B. Minford, who served in the Women's Army Corps during World War II and attained the rank of captain before receiving her discharge in 1946. They were the parents of six children: Thomas A. Girard, PhD; Renee Julia Girard; Charles Jack Girard Jr.; Stephanie Joan Girard (deceased); Yvonne (Bonnie) Dawes Girard; and Marguerite Florence Girard.

See also
U.S. Army general officers who died in the Vietnam War:
William R. Bond
George W. Casey Sr.
John A. B. Dillard
Alfred Judson Force Moody
Richard J. Tallman
Keith L. Ware

References

1917 births
1970 deaths
United States Army generals
The Citadel, The Military College of South Carolina alumni
United States Army Command and General Staff College alumni
United States Army War College alumni
United States Army personnel of World War II
United States Army personnel of the Vietnam War
Recipients of the Distinguished Service Medal (US Army)
Recipients of the Silver Star
Recipients of the Legion of Merit
Recipients of the Distinguished Flying Cross (United States)
Burials at Arlington National Cemetery
American military personnel killed in the Vietnam War